Mimi Kristine Berdal (born 15 June 1959) is a Norwegian lawyer and businessperson.

A lawyer by profession, she graduated as cand.jur. (Candidate of Law) from the University of Oslo in 1987. She was a research assistant from 1985 to 1986, worked for Total from 1989 and as a lawyer from 1990.

She chaired the board of directors of Stabæk Fotball from 2005 to 2009, became chair of Rec in 2013, has chaired Rocksource and Infratek, and is a member of the board of Itera, Synnøve Finden, Q-Free and Gassco and a former member of the board of Norsk Rikstoto and Øvrevoll Galopp. She has been recognized as having most board memberships of all women in Norway, with approximately 90 in total.

References

1959 births
Living people
University of Oslo alumni
21st-century Norwegian businesswomen
21st-century Norwegian businesspeople
Norwegian women lawyers
20th-century Norwegian lawyers
20th-century women lawyers